was a rear admiral in the Imperial Japanese Navy who served during the Second Sino-Japanese War, and in the Pacific War during World War II. Yamaguchi′s carrier force was part of the attack on Pearl Harbor.

Biography

Early career
Yamaguchi was born in Koishikawa Tokyo, and was the third son of a former samurai retainer of Matsue Domain. His given name "Tamon" was the childhood name of the medieval hero Kusunoki Masashige. He attended the Kaisei Academy and was accepted into the 40th class of the Imperial Japanese Naval Academy, which he graduated in 1912, ranked 21st out of 144 cadets. His classmates included Takijirō Ōnishi and Matome Ugaki. As an ensign, he served on the cruiser  and battleship . After his commissioning as a lieutenant junior grade, he completed naval artillery and torpedo school training and was assigned to the 3rd Submarine Squadron in December 1916. He was dispatched to the Mediterranean with the Japanese fleet as part of Japan's contribution to the Anglo-Japanese Alliance in World War I and participated in combat operations as an officer on the destroyer  based on Malta from July 1918. He was promoted to the rank of Lieutenant in December of that year. In January 1919, he was assigned to a navigation unit with the naval squadron escorting Imperial German Navy submarines received by the Japanese government as part of reparation payments from Germany at the end of World War I. He served in shore-based administrative assignments at Yokosuka Naval District (from July 1919), Kure Naval District (from October 1919) and Sasebo Naval District (from December 1920).

In March 1921, Yamaguchi was sent to the  United States to attend Princeton University at the Navy's expense, and returned to Japan in May 1923. On his return to Japan, he was assigned to the battleship  for six months, before serving as an instructor at the Submarine School from December 1923 to December 1924. He then attended the Naval Staff College, from which he graduated with honors in November 1926. From November 1927, he was  assigned to the Imperial Japanese Navy General Staff. Yamaguchi was promoted to commander in December 1928.

Assigned to the Japanese delegation at the London Naval Conference 1930, he joined Admiral Isoroku Yamamoto in vocal opposition to the terms of the disarmament treaty. After his return to Japan, he was assigned as executive officer on the cruiser  from July 1930. From November 1930, he was assigned to the staff of the Combined Fleet. He served as an instructor at the Naval Staff College from November 1932 and was promoted to the rank of captain in December of that year.

Yamaguchi was the naval attaché to the Japanese embassy at  Washington, D.C., from June 1934 to November 1936. On his return to Japan, he received his first command, the cruiser  from December 1936 to December 1937, followed by the battleship  to December 1938.

World War II
With the start of the Second Sino-Japanese War, Ise was assigned to patrols off the southern Chinese coast. Yamaguchi was promoted to  rear admiral on 15 November 1938. From December, he was the chief-of-staff of the IJN 5th Fleet and from November 1939 was on the staff of the IJN 1st Fleet. in January 1940, he became commander of  the 1st Combined Air Group, and in this capacity directed a  saturation bombing campaign in central China through 1940, including the Bombing of Chongqing.

In preparation for the attack on Pearl Harbor, Yamaguchi trained his flight crews ruthlessly, which led to many accidents and complaints; however, the training paid off after the start of combat operations. Following the successful strike against the American fleet at Pearl Harbor, Yamaguchi′s carrier force participated in the Battle of Wake Island. After the start of 1942, he was sent south to assist in the Battle of Ambon in the Dutch East Indies, followed by the Bombing of Darwin in February. In March, his carriers supported Japanese forces in the Battle of Java, sweeping the Dutch East Indies of remaining Allied warships. In April, he crossed into the Indian Ocean to support the large-scale raid against the Royal Navy at and near Ceylon.

Yamaguchi returned to Japan briefly in late April for maintenance on his fleet. In June 1942, he was assigned to the Midway operation. During the battle, on 4 June 1942, Yamaguchi disagreed with the fleet commander, Vice Admiral Chūichi Nagumo. A reconnaissance plane discovered an American aircraft carrier near Midway. At that moment, the Japanese planes had been armed for a second strike on Midway, with the "Kate" level bombers carrying bombs rather than torpedoes. Yamaguchi called for an immediate strike on the US ship, with the planes armed as they were, but Nagumo decided instead to wait until the planes had been re-armed. Shortly afterward, American carrier aircraft destroyed all the Japanese carriers except Yamaguchi′s flagship Hiryū. Yamaguchi quickly ordered two successive attacks on Yorktown which crippled it.

Yamaguchi was killed in action, choosing to go down with the wrecked aircraft carrier. He and the captain of Hiryū, Tomeo Kaku, summoned all officers and crew to the flight deck, and Yamaguchi addressed them, taking responsibility for the loss of Hiryū and Soryu. He announced, "I shall remain on board to the end. I command all of you to leave the ship and continue your loyal service to His Majesty, the Emperor." Yamaguchi then led his men in three Banzai cheers for the Emperor. As the men began leaving, Kaku turned to Yamaguchi and said "I am going to share the fate of the ship, sir." The admiral agreed, and both men began calmly admiring the moon. Yamaguchi said to Kaku, "Let us enjoy the beauty of the moon." "How bright it shines," Kaku agreed, "It must be in its twenty-first day." Yamaguchi refused to allow his staff officers to stay with them. He asked Commander Ito for two last messages; the first was for Admiral Nagumo: "I have no words to apologize for what has happened. I only wish for a stronger Japanese Navy and revenge." The second was for Captain Toshio Abe, commanding the destroyer : "Scuttle the Hiryū with your torpedoes." All the men, including Yamaguchi and Kaku, then shared naval biscuits and water, in a farewell toast. As Commander Ito left, Yamaguchi handed him his cap as a keepsake for his family. Yamaguchi and Kaku were last seen on the bridge of the stricken carrier waving to the crew who were abandoning ship. Captain Abe carried out his final order and the  torpedoed Hiryū. One torpedo missed and the other struck near the bow without the typical plume of water, although the detonation was quite visible. Hiryū sank four hours later. Yamaguchi was posthumously promoted to the rank of vice admiral and awarded the Order of the Golden Kite, 1st class.

Decorations
 1939 –  Order of the Sacred Treasure, 2nd class 
 1945 –  Order of the Golden Kite, 1st class

Promotions
Midshipman – 17 July 1912
Ensign – 1 December 1913
Sublieutenant – 13 December 1915
Lieutenant – 1 December 1918
Lieutenant Commander – 1 December 1924
Commander – 10 December 1928
Captain – 1 December 1932
Rear Admiral – 15 November 1938
Vice Admiral – 5 June 1942 (Posthumous)

In film and fiction
In the 1960 film Hawaii Midway Ocean Combat; The Storm in The Pacific (ハワイ・ミッドウェイ大海空戦 太平洋の嵐), Yamaguchi was portrayed by Toshiro Mifune.

In the 1970 film Tora! Tora! Tora!, Yamaguchi was portrayed by Susumu Fujita.

In the 1976 film Midway, Yamaguchi was portrayed by Hawaiian actor John Fujioka.

He appears in the 2009 manga series by Kouta Hirano, Drifters. In the 2016 anime adaptation, he is voiced by Yutaka Nakano.

In Toei's 2011 war film Isoroku, Yamaguchi was portrayed by Hiroshi Abe.

Yamaguchi (voiced by Yutaka Nakano) is one of the protagonists of the Drifters manga and anime.

In the 2019 film Midway, Yamaguchi is portrayed by Tadanobu Asano.

References
Fuchida, Mitsuo (with C.H. Kawakami and Roger Pineau), Midway - The Battle that Doomed Japan: The Japanese Navy's Story, Annapolis, 1955.

Peattie, Mark R., Sunburst: The Rise of Japanese Naval Air Power 1909-1941, Annapolis, Maryland: Naval Institute Press, 2001,

External links 

Kita Renzo's famous painting of Yamaguchi's Last Moments

Footnotes

1892 births
1942 deaths
Captains who went down with the ship
People from Tokyo
Battle of Midway
Imperial Japanese Navy admirals
Japanese admirals of World War II
Japanese military personnel killed in World War II
Japanese military attachés
Princeton University alumni
Recipients of the Order of the Sacred Treasure, 2nd class
Recipients of the Order of the Golden Kite, 1st class
Recipients of the Order of the Rising Sun